Elachista albifrontella is a moth of the family Elachistidae found in Europe.

Description
The head is white with a conspicuously whitish forehead. Forewings are blackish ; a somewhat oblique fascia before middle, sometimes interrupted, a tornal spot, and a rather larger triangular costal spot beyond it white. Hindwings dark grey.The larva is yellow-whitish; head pale brown; 2 with three rows of brown dots.

They are on wing from June to July in one generation per year.

The larvae feed on velvet bent (Agrostis canina), meadow foxtail (Alopecurus pratensis), false oat-grass (Arrhenatherum elatius), oats (Avena species), Avenula pubescens, false-brome (Brachypodium sylvaticum), bromes (Bromus species), bunch grass (Calamagrostis arundinacea), Calamagrostis epigejos, Dactylis glomerata, Deschampsia cespitosa, Elymus repens, Festuca rubra, Holcus lanatus, Holcus mollis, Koeleria macrantha, Luzula pilosa, Milium effusum, Phalaris arundinacea, Phleum, Poa pratensis, rough meadow-grass (Poa trivialis), oatgrass (Trisetum species) and wheat (Triticum species). They mine the leaves of their host plant. The mine consists of a full depth blotch mine which descends from the leaf tip. It occupies half to the entire width of the blade. Larvae may exit the mine and start again elsewhere. The frass is deposited in a narrow central line with a greyish brown colour. Larvae can be found from September to May. Pupation takes place outside of the mine.

Distribution
It is found from Fennoscandia and northern Russia to the Pyrenees and Italy and from Ireland to Romania.

References

albifrontella
Leaf miners
Moths described in 1817
Moths of Europe
Taxa named by Jacob Hübner